New Cool Collective is a Dutch musical ensemble founded in 1993, core members are Benjamin Herman (sax), Joost Kroon (drums), Frank van Dok (percussion), Willem Friede (keyboard / arranger), Jos de Haas (percussion), Leslie Lopez (bass) and David Rockefeller (trumpet).

They also perform in a 19-piece big band line-up; the New Cool Collective Big Band consists of two alto saxophones, two tenor saxophones, one baritone saxophone, four trumpets, three trombones, one bass trombone, guitar, Fender Rhodes, percussion, congas, drums and vocals.

In 2000 they won the Edison Jazz Award, the most prestigious music award of the Netherlands. 
In 2013 the band won a Golden Calf award on the Dutch Film Festival for the music they made for the Dutch movie Toegetakeld door de liefde, in which they also have a cameo as a fictional band. The music of that movie is recorded on their album Chin Chin.

New Cool Collective went on to collaborate with Guus Meeuwis on 2014's Hollandse Meesters (cover-versions of Dutch evergreens) and with Mark Reilly from Matt Bianco on 2015's The Things You Love-EP. Both were followed with parts 1 and 2 of Electric Monkey Sessions. 

In 2018 the band received another Edison Award for their album New Cool Collective Big Band ft. Thierno Koité, featuring Senegalese saxophone player Thierno Koité from Orchestra Baobab.

References

External links 

1994 establishments in the Netherlands
Dutch jazz ensembles